Neil McLeod (c.1846 – 30 July 1890) was a Constable of the New Zealand Police. He was shot and killed while aboard the steamer Minnie Casey at Mangawhare Wharf (near Dargaville) by gum-digger Henry Funcke.

McLeod, his wife and family were travelling to Auckland, having boarded the steamer at Dargaville. Funcke also came aboard at Dargaville, with a gun, a concealed revolver and a knife. Funcke was very noisy during the trip, and the captain of the Minnie Casey took away his gun. Just after the steamer left Mangawhare Wharf, he threatened to shoot some of the passengers if he did not get his gun back. The steamer put back to Mangawhare Wharf, and Constables McLeod and Scott took Funcke ashore. From the shore Funcke once more demanded his gun as the Minnie Casey left again, and fired five shots at the departing steamer. Standing at the railing, McLeod was hit in the heart by the third shot. He exclaimed "My God" and died.

The steamer returned to Dargaville, where McLeod's body was taken off. A group of settlers armed themselves with rifles and, led by Constables Scott and Carr, walked back to Mangawhare Wharf in pursuit. The group found Funcke still at the wharf, demanded he surrender, and fired a blank shot. Funcke lifted up his hands as if to fire and was shot twice, in the groin and chest. He fell, and was arrested. He was reportedly a 'maniac' and had been drinking before the incident.

McLeod's body was taken to Auckland for burial.

References

External links
 New Zealand Police Memorial Page

1840s births
1890 deaths
Deaths by firearm in New Zealand
Male murder victims
New Zealand police officers
People murdered in New Zealand